Riverside Park is a town park situated in the town of Glenrothes, Fife. The park has pleasant woodland walks, floral gardens, a pond and recently an Arboretum has been planted. The park has several play areas and town art sculptures, adventure play areas, seasonal toilets and fitness equipment. It also features a few statues and objects from Boblingen, Germany, the twin town of Glenrothes.

History 
The park used to belong to the Earl of Rothes as his garden, from the time of John Leslie, 1st Duke & 7th Earl of Rothes until the time of Norman Leslie, 19th Earl of Rothes. The park contains Leslie House, which was closed in 2009. It is guarded and it is illegal to enter the property.

Gallery

References 

Earls of Rothes
Parks in Fife
Glenrothes